Tom Fabricio is an American attorney and politician serving as a member of the Florida House of Representatives from the 103rd district. He assumed office on November 3, 2020.

Early life and education 
Fabricio was born in Miami. He earned a Bachelor of Arts degree in world literatures and political science from Marymount Manhattan College in 2005 and a Juris Doctor from the Shepard Broad College of Law at Nova Southeastern University in 2008.

Career 
In 2006, Fabricio was a law clerk for the Florida Third District Court of Appeal. From 2011 to 2017, he was an associate at Walton Lantaff Schroeder & Carson LLP. In 2017 and 2018, he was an attorney at Mintzer Sarowitz Zeris Ledva & Meyers LLP. From 2016 to 2018, Fabricio was a member of the Broward County Charter Review Commission. He was elected to the Florida House of Representatives in November 2020. He is a member of the House Commerce Committee.

References 

Living people
Year of birth missing (living people)
Politicians from Miami
Marymount Manhattan College alumni
Nova Southeastern University alumni
Florida lawyers
Republican Party members of the Florida House of Representatives
21st-century American politicians